Memphis State Recreation Area (SRA) is a 163-acre state recreation area in east-central Nebraska, United States. The recreation area surrounds the 48-acre Memphis Lake where you can go fishing for largemouth bass, bluegill, and channel catfish. You can also go non-powered boating. Within the recreation area you can also camp and hike. The recreation area is managed by the Nebraska Game and Parks Commission.

The recreation area is approximately 20 miles west of Omaha.

References

External links
 Memphis State Recreation Area - Nebraska Game & Parks Commission
 Nebraska Game and Parks Commission

Protected areas of Saunders County, Nebraska
Protected areas of Nebraska
State parks of Nebraska